Kirushya is one of 17 wards/divisions of Ngara District, in the Kagera Region of Tanzania. It is located near Burundi and Rwanda. The name itself comes from a word for "tedious"; the area is largely a dry hill, and the scarcity of water forced residents to travel long distances for resupply. Such a journey is tedious, hence the name. In the 2017 government plans, 41% of Kirushya's population had clean water.

In 2016 the Tanzania National Bureau of Statistics report there were 12,062 people in the ward, from 10,628 in 2012.

Villages 
The ward has 23 villages.

 Mubisumulizi
 Murubila
 Kumuyaga
 Mumakombe
 Kumutumba
 Kasange Nyabigogo
 Kasange kati
 Mukahama
 Gwamanyagu
 Kirushya Mwisenga
 Kamilo
 Kirushya
 Rugenge
 Masale
 Nyamigango
 Mwivuza Murugarama A
 Murugarama B
 Mundaro A
 Mundaro B
 Mubayange A
 Mubayange B
 Mukabenga
 Mumaliza

References

Wards of Tanzania